Katharina Lehner (born April 9, 1990) is a German mixed martial artist who last competed in Bellator MMA. She has also previously fought in Invicta FC. She fought Sarah Kaufman for the Invicta Bantamweight title in the main event of Invicta FC 29.

Mixed martial arts career

Invicta FC
Lehner made her professional debut against Anne Merkt at We Love MMA 9 on September 27, 2014. She won the fight by split decision, and amassed a 5–0 record before signing with Invicta FC. Lehner made her debut against Alexa Conners at Invicta FC 25: Kunitskaya vs. Pa'aluhi on August 31, 2017. She won the fight by a first-round technical knockout.

After defeating Gemma Pike by unanimous decision at Hype FC 7 on December 16, 2017, Lehner was booked to face Sarah Kaufman for the vacant Invicta FC Bantamweight Championship at Invicta FC 29: Kaufman vs. Lehner on May 4, 2018. She lost the fight by a third-round submission.

Lehner faced Lisa Spangler at Invicta FC 35: Bennett vs. Rodriguez II on June 7, 2019. She lost the fight by unanimous decision.

Lehner faced Sinead Kavanagh at Bellator Milan 3 on October 3, 2020, following a 16-month absence from the sport. She lost the fight by unanimous decision.

Lehner was expected to face Talita Bernardo at Invicta FC 48 on July 20, 2022. Lehner withdrew for an undisclosed reason and was replaced by Yana Gadelha.

Lehner was rebooked against Talita Bernardo on November 16, 2022 at Invicta FC 50, getting submitted via a kimura in the second round.

Mixed martial arts record

|-
|Win
|align=center| 8–4
|Abril Anguiano
|Decision (unanimous)
|Peak Fighting 27
|
|align=center|3
|align=center|5:00
|Frisco, Texas, United States
|
|-
|Loss
|align=center| 7–4
|Talita Bernardo
|Submission (kimura)
|Invicta FC 50
|
|align=center|2
|align=center|4:26
|Denver, Colorado, United States
|
|-
| Loss
| align=center| 7–3
| Sinead Kavanagh
| Decision (unanimous)
| Bellator Milan 3
| 
| align=center| 3
| align=center| 5:00
| Milan, Italy
|
|-
| Loss
| align=center| 7–2
| Lisa Spangler
| Decision (unanimous)
| Invicta FC 35: Bennett vs. Rodriguez II
| 
| align=center| 3
| align=center| 5:00
| Kansas City, Kansas, United States
|
|-
| Loss
| align=center| 7–1
| Sarah Kaufman
| Submission (rear-naked choke)
| Invicta FC 29: Kaufman vs. Lehner
| 
| align=center| 3
| align=center| 4:30
| Kansas City, Missouri, United States
|
|-
| Win
| align=center| 7–0
| Gemma Pike
| Decision (unanimous)
| Hype FC 7
| 
| align=center| 3
| align=center| 5:00
| Bremen, Germany
|
|-
| Win
| align=center| 6–0
| Alexa Conners
| TKO (punches)
| Invicta FC 25: Kunitskaya vs. Pa'aluhi
| 
| align=center| 1
| align=center| 4:21
| Lemoore, California, United States
|
|-
| Win
| align=center| 5–0
| Judith Ruis
| Decision (unanimous)
| Respect FC 18
| 
| align=center| 3
| align=center| 5:00
| Cologne, Germany
|
|-
| Win
| align=center| 4–0
| Alexandra Buch
| Decision (unanimous)
| GMC 7
| 
| align=center| 3
| align=center| 5:00
| Castrop-Rauxel, Germany
|
|-
| Win
| align=center| 3–0
| Camilla Hinze
| Decision (unanimous)
| We Love MMA 15
| 
| align=center| 3
| align=center| 5:00
| Berlin, Germany
|
|-
| Win
| align=center| 2–0
| Barbora Polakova
| Decision (unanimous)
| Young Blood Night Vol. 3: War Zone
| 
| align=center| 3
| align=center| 5:00
| Fürth, Germany
|
|-
| Win
| align=center| 1–0
| Anne Merkt
| Decision (split)
| We Love MMA 9
| 
| align=center| 2
| align=center| 5:00
| Hamburg, Germany
|-

References

External links
 
 Katharina Lehner at Invicta FC

1990 births
German female mixed martial artists
Bantamweight mixed martial artists
Sportspeople from Cologne
Featherweight mixed martial artists
Living people